The Meissel–Lehmer algorithm (after Ernst Meissel and Derrick Henry Lehmer) is an algorithm that computes exact values of the prime-counting function.

Description 

The problem of counting the exact number of primes less than or equal to x, without actually listing them all, dates from  Legendre. He observed from the Sieve of Eratosthenes that
 

where  is the  floor function, which denotes the greatest integer less than or equal to x and the  run over all primes .

Since the evaluation of this sum formula becomes more and more complex and confusing for large x, Meissel tried to simplify the counting of the numbers in the Sieve of Eratosthenes. He and Lehmer therefore introduced certain sieve functions, which are detailed below.

Key functions 

Let  be the first n primes. For a natural number a ≥ 1, define
 
Also define for a natural number k,

 

With these, we have

where the sum only has finitely many nonzero terms because  when .

This is what the Meissel–Lehmer algorithm does.

Formula for Pk(x, a) 
For k = 2, we get the following formula for :

For k ≥ 3, the identities for  can be derived similarly.

Expanding 𝜑(x, a) 
With the starting condition 
 
and the recurrence
 
each value for  can be calculated recursively.

Combining the terms 
This can be done by direct sieving and using the above formulas.

History 

Meissel already found that for k ≥ 3,  if .

Extended algorithm 

Jeffrey Lagarias, Victor Miller and Andrew Odlyzko published a realisation of the algorithm which computes  in time  and space  for any . Upon setting , the tree of  has  leaf nodes.

This extended Meissel-Lehmer algorithm needs less computing time than the algorithm developed by Meissel and Lehmer, especially for big values of x.

Further improvements of the algorithm are given by M. Deleglise and J. Rivat in 1996.

References 

Number theoretic algorithms